Babloo Happy Hai is a 2014 Indian Hindi-language film directed by Nila Madhab Panda, who earlier directed I am Kalam and Jalpari. It is a love story of today's youngsters, and what they think love and sex are in the times of multiplexes and fast cars. The film features Sahil Anand, Erica Fernandes, Sumit Suri, Amol Parashar, Preet Kamal, Anu Choudhury, Reyhna Malhotra and Parvin Dabas in pivotal roles. The film's name was originally Love is not mathematics. The film released on 7 February 2014, along with three other Bollywood films - Hasee Toh Phasee, Heartless and Ya Rab.

Cast
Sahil Anand as Jatin 
Erica Fernandes as Natasha 
Parvin Dabas as Harsh
Sumit Suri as Harry 
Amol Parashar as Rohan
Preet Kamal as Tamanna 
Anu Choudhury as Deepa
Reyhna Malhotra as Gazala 
Gulzar Khan
Amit Rana

Soundtrack
The soundtrack was composed by Bishakh Jyoti &Kanish with lyrics by Protique Mojoomdar.

Critical reception
The film received mixed reviews. Taran Adarsh of Bollywood Hungama gave it 1.5 stars. Renuka Vyavahare of Times of India gave the film 2 stars. Subhash K jha and Yahoo India News gave it 4 stars. MTV India gave it 3.5 stars. while India TV News gave it 4 stars.

Awards and nominations

See also
Bollywood films of 2014

References

External links
 

2014 films
2010s Hindi-language films